The 1908 Grand National was the 70th renewal of the Grand National horse race that took place at Aintree near Liverpool, England, on 27 March 1908.

Finishing Order

Non-finishers

References

 1908
Grand National
Grand National
20th century in Lancashire
March 1908 sports events